Guan Moye (born 17 February 1955), better known by the pen name Mo Yan, is a Chinese novelist and short story writer.  Donald Morrison of U.S. news magazine TIME referred to him as "one of the most famous, oft-banned and widely pirated of all Chinese writers", and Jim Leach called him the Chinese answer to Franz Kafka or Joseph Heller. In 2012, Mo was awarded the Nobel Prize in Literature for his work as a writer "who with hallucinatory realism merges folk tales, history and the contemporary".

He is best known to Western readers for his 1986 novel Red Sorghum, the first two parts of which were adapted as the Golden Bear-winning film Red Sorghum (1988). He won the 2005 International Nonino Prize in Italy. In 2009, he was the first recipient of the University of Oklahoma's Newman Prize for Chinese Literature.

Early life
Mo Yan was born in February 1955 into a peasant family in Ping'an Village, Gaomi Township, northeast of Shandong Province, the People's Republic of China. He is the youngest of four children with two older brothers and an older sister. His family was of an upper-middle peasant class background. Mo was 11 years old when the Cultural Revolution was launched, at which time he left school to work as a farmer. In the autumn of 1973, he began work at the cotton oil processing factory. During this period, which coincided with a succession of political campaigns from the Great Leap Forward to the Cultural Revolution, his access to literature was largely limited to novels in the socialist realist style under Mao Zedong, which centered largely on the themes of class struggle and conflict.

At the close of the Cultural Revolution in 1976, Mo enlisted in the People's Liberation Army (PLA), and began writing while he was still a soldier. During this post-Revolution era when he emerged as a writer, both the lyrical and epic works of Chinese literature, as well as translations of foreign authors such as William Faulkner and Gabriel García Márquez, would make an impact on his works.

In 1984, he received a literary award from the PLA Magazine, and the same year began attending the People's Liberation Army Arts College, where he first adopted the pen name of Mo Yan. He published his first novella, A Transparent Radish, in 1984, and released Red Sorghum in 1986, launching his career as a nationally recognized novelist. In 1991, he graduated from the creation graduate class of Lu Xun School of literature, and obtained a master's degree in literature from Beijing Normal University.

Pen name
"Mo Yan" – "don't speak" in Chinese – is his pen name. Mo Yan has explained on occasion that the name comes from a warning from his father and mother not to speak his mind while outside, because of China's revolutionary political situation from the 1950s, when he grew up. It also relates to the subject matter of Mo Yan's writings, which reinterpret Chinese political and sexual history.

In an interview with Professor David Wang, Mo Yan stated that he changed his "official name" to Mo Yan because he could not receive royalties under the pen name.

Works
Mo Yan began his career as a writer in the reform and opening up period, publishing dozens of short stories and novels in Chinese. His first published short story was "Falling Rain on a Spring Night", published in September 1981.

In 1986, the five parts that formed his first novel, Red Sorghum (1987), were published serially. It is a non-chronological novel about the generations of a Shandong family between 1923 and 1976. The author deals with upheavals in Chinese history such as the Second Sino-Japanese War, the 1949 Communist Revolution, and the Cultural Revolution, but in an unconventional way; for example from the point of view of the invading Japanese soldiers.

His second novel, The Garlic Ballads, is based on a true story of when the farmers of Gaomi Township rioted against a government that would not buy its crops. The Republic of Wine is a satire around gastronomy and alcohol, which uses cannibalism as a metaphor for Chinese self-destruction, following Lu Xun. Big Breasts & Wide Hips deals with female bodies, from a grandmother whose breasts are shattered by Japanese bullets, to a festival where one of the child characters, Shangguan Jintong, blesses each woman of his town by stroking her breasts. The book was controversial in China because some leftist critics objected to Big Breasts''' perceived negative portrayal of Communist soldiers.

Extremely prolific, Mo Yan wrote Life and Death Are Wearing Me Out in only 42 days. He composed the more than 500,000 characters contained in the original manuscript on traditional Chinese paper using only ink and a writing brush. He prefers writing his novels by hand rather than by typing using a pinyin input method, because the latter method "limits your vocabulary". Life and Death Are Wearing Me Out is a meta-fiction about the story of a landlord who is reincarnated in the form of various animals during the Chinese land reform movement. The landlord observes and satirizes Communist society, such as when he (as a donkey) forces two mules to share food with him, because "[in] the age of communism... mine is yours and yours is mine."Pow!, Mo Yan's first work to be translated into English after receiving the Nobel Prize, is about a young storytelling boy named Luo who was famous in his village for eating so much meat. His village is so carnivorous it is an obsession that leads to corruption. Pow! cemented his writing style as “hallucinatory realism”. Another one of his works, Frog, Yan's latest novel published, focuses on the cause and consequences of China's One-Child Policy. Set in a small rural Chinese town called Gaomi, the narrator Tadpole tells the story of his aunt Gugu, who once was a hero for delivering life into the world as a midwife, now takes away life as an abortion provider. Steven Moore from the Washington Post wrote, “another display of Mo Yan’s attractively daring approach to fiction. The Nobel committee chose wisely.”

Impact of works

Mo Yan's ability to convey traditionalist values inside of his mythical realism writing style in The Old Gun has allowed insight and view on the swift modernization of China. This short story of Mo Yan was an exemplary example for the "Xungen movement" Chinese literary movement and influenced many to turn back to traditional values. This movement portrayed the fear of loss of cultural identity due to the swift modernization of China in the 1980s.

Mo Yan's masterpieces have been translated into English by translator Howard Goldblatt. Goldblatt has effectively transmitted Chinese culture to target audiences by using a domestication technique augmented with foreignization.

Influences
Mo Yan's works are predominantly social commentary, and he is strongly influenced by the social realism of Lu Xun and the magical realism of Gabriel García Márquez. In terms of traditional Chinese literature, he is deeply inspired by the folklore-based classical epic novel Water Margin. He cites Journey to the West and Dream of the Red Chamber as formative influences. Mo Yan's writing style has also been influenced by the Six Dynasties, Chuanqi, notebook novels of the Ming and Qing Dynasties and especially by folk oral literature. His creation combines all of these inspirations into one of the most distinctive voices in world literature.

Mo Yan, who himself reads foreign authors in translation, strongly advocates the reading of world literature. At a speech to open the 2009 Frankfurt Book Fair, he discussed Goethe's idea of "world literature", stating that "literature can overcome the barriers that separate countries and nations".

Style
Mo Yan's works are epic historical novels characterized by hallucinatory realism and containing elements of black humor. Mo Yan's language is distinguished by his imaginative use of colour expressions. A major theme in Mo Yan's works is the constancy of human greed and corruption, despite the influence of ideology. Using dazzling, complex, and often graphically violent images, he sets many of his stories near his hometown, Northeast Gaomi Township in Shandong province. Mo Yan says he realised that he could make "[my] family, [the] people I'm familiar with, the villagers..." his characters after reading William Faulkner's The Sound and the Fury. He satirizes the genre of socialist realism by placing workers and bureaucrats into absurd situations.

Mo Yan's writing is characterised by the blurring of distinctions between "past and present, dead and living, as well as good and bad". Mo Yan appears in his novels as a semi-autobiographical character who retells and modifies the author's other stories. His female characters often fail to observe traditional gender roles, such as the mother of the Shangguan family in Big Breasts & Wide Hips, who, failing to bear her husband any sons, instead is an adulterer, becoming pregnant with girls by a Swedish missionary and a Japanese soldier, among others. Male power is also portrayed cynically in Big Breasts & Wide Hips, and there is only one male hero in the novel.

List of works
Mo Yan has written 11 novels, and several novellas and short story collections.

This is a complete list of Mo Yan's works published as a collection in 2012 in China (after Mo Yan received the Nobel Prize).

Novels
 《红高粱家族》 Red Sorghum (1986)
 《天堂蒜薹之歌》 The Garlic Ballads (1988)
 《十三步》 Thirteen Steps (1988)
 《食草家族》 The Herbivorous Family (1993)
 《酒国》 The Republic of Wine: A Novel (1993)
 《丰乳肥臀》 Big Breasts & Wide Hips (1995)
 《红树林》 Red Forest (1999)
 《檀香刑》 Sandalwood Death (2001)
 《四十一炮》 Pow! (2003)
 《生死疲劳》 Life and Death Are Wearing Me Out (2006)
 《蛙》 Frog (2009)

Short story and novella collections
 《白狗秋千架》 White Dog and the Swing (30 short stories, 1981–1989)
 《与大师约会》 Meeting the Masters (45 short stories, 1990–2005)
 《欢乐》 Joy (8 novellas; six of them are published in English as Explosions and Other Stories)
 《怀抱鲜花的女人》 The Woman with Flowers (8 novellas, 2012)
 《师傅越来越幽默》Shifu, You'll Do Anything for a Laugh (9 novellas, 2001; one of them, Change, is published independently in English)
 《晚熟的人》A Late Bloomer (12 novellas and short stories, 2020)

Other works
 《会唱歌的墙》 The Wall Can Sing (60 essays, 1981–2011)
 《我们的荆轲》 Our Jing Ke (play)
 《碎语文学》 Broken Philosophy (interviews, only available in Chinese)
 《用耳朵阅读》 Ears to Read (speeches, only available in Chinese)
 《盛典:诺奖之行》 Grand CeremonyAwards and honours
 1998: Neustadt International Prize for Literature, candidate
 2005: Kiriyama Prize, Notable Books, Big Breasts and Wide Hips 2005: International Nonino Prize
 2005: Doctor of Letters, Open University of Hong Kong
 2006: Fukuoka Asian Culture Prize XVII
 2007: Man Asian Literary Prize, nominee, Big Breasts and Wide Hips 2009: Newman Prize for Chinese Literature, winner, Life and Death Are Wearing Me Out 2010: Honorary Fellow, Modern Language Association
 2011: Mao Dun Literature Prize, winner, Frog 2012: Nobel Prize in Literature

Honorary doctorate
 2013: The City University of New York, United States
 2013: Fo Guang University, Taiwan
 2014: Sofia University, Bulgaria
 2014: The Open University of Hong Kong, China
 2014: The University of Macau, China
 2017: Hong Kong Baptist University, China

Adaptations
Several of Mo Yan's works have been adapted for film:

 Red Sorghum (1987) (directed by Zhang Yimou)
 The Sun Has Ears (1995) (directed by Yim Ho, adaptation of Grandma Wearing Red Silk)
 Happy Times (2000) (directed by Zhang Yimou, adaptation of Shifu: You'll Do Anything for a Laugh)
 Nuan (2003) (directed by Huo Jianqi, adaptation of White Dog Swing)

 See also 
 Chinese literature
 List of Nobel laureates in Literature
 List of Chinese writers

References

Further reading
 Chinese Writers on Writing featuring Mo Yan. Ed. Arthur Sze. (Trinity University Press, 2010).

External links

 Novelist Mo Yan Takes Aim with 41 Bombs (China Daily 27 June 2003)
 VÍDEO prize movie of Mo Yan 
 "Granta Audio: Mo Yan", Granta, 11 October 2012, John Freeman
 Russian site about Mo Yan
  Mo Yan and the Politics of Language China Digital Times 25 February 2013.
 Mo Yan dismisses 'envious' Nobel critics The Guardian'' 28 February 2013.
 School dropout to Nobel: A consistent beauty of Mo Yan  FacenFacts
 
List of Works

1955 births
20th-century Chinese novelists
21st-century Chinese novelists
People's Liberation Army Arts College alumni
Beijing Normal University alumni
Academic staff of Beijing Normal University
Chinese male short story writers
Living people
Nobel laureates in Literature
Nobel laureates of the People's Republic of China
Writers from Weifang
People's Liberation Army personnel
Mao Dun Literature Prize laureates
International Writing Program alumni
Chinese male novelists
20th-century Chinese short story writers
21st-century Chinese short story writers
People's Republic of China short story writers
Short story writers from Shandong
People from Gaomi